is the fifth studio album by Japanese singer-songwriter Yosui Inoue, issued in March 1976. It was the first long-play record he released under the For Life Records, a record label that he joined as one of the co-founders and started in 1975.

Track listing
All songs written and composed by Yōsui Inoue, except where indicated

Side one
"Good, Good-Bye" – 3:37
"" – 3:43
"" – 1:56
"" – 4:38
"Summer" – 3:38
"" – 4:38
"" – 438

Side two
"" – 4:39
"" (Inoue, Kei Ogura) – 3:22
"" – 3:02
"" – 2:54
"" – 3:45
"" – 6:21

Personnel
Yōsui Inoue – Acoustic guitar, electric guitar, electric bass, backing vocals
Hiromi Yasuda – Acoustic guitar
Hirofumi Tokutake – Electric guitar
Masayoshi Takanaka – Electric guitar, acoustic guitar
Mitsuo Nagai – Electric guitar, flat mandolin
Kazuo Shiina – Electric guitar
Hirokuni Korekata (occasionally credited to Kunihiro Korekata) – Electric guitar
Kenji Ōmura – Electric guitar
Shigeru Suzuki – 12-string guitar
Hirobumi Suzuki – Electric bass
Toru Hirano – Electric bass
Tsugutoshi Goto – Electric bass
Rei Ohara – Electric bass
Hiroki Komazawa – Steel guitar
Kunimitsu Inaba – Wood bass
Masahiro Takekawa – Violin
Takayoshi Watanabe – Keyboards
Shigehito Ōhara – Piano
Masaru Imada –  Electric piano
Jun Fukamachi – Electric piano
Akiko Yano – Keyboards, backing vocals
Makoto Yano – Keyboards, electric piano, rhythm box, percussion
Ichiro Maeda – Keyboards, percussion, rhythm box
Katz Hoshi – Percussion, backing vocals
Shuichi Murakami – Drums
Tatsuo Hayashi – Drums
Tetsurō Kashibuchi – Drums
Motoya Hamaguchi – Percussion
Sancho Nanoha – Percussion
Nobuo Saito – Percussion
Fujio Saito – Percussion
Yukiko Nishizawa –  Ocarina
Sumio Okada – Horn
Kouji Hatori – Horn
Kinji Yoshino – 6th

Chart positions

Album

Singles

Release history

References

1976 albums
Yōsui Inoue albums